Aclytia terra is a moth of the family Erebidae. It was described by William Schaus in 1896. It is found in São Paulo, Brazil.

References

Moths described in 1896
Aclytia
Moths of South America